The Pat Lowther Memorial Award is an annual Canadian literary award presented by the League of Canadian Poets to the year's best book of poetry by a Canadian woman. The award was established in 1980 to honour poet Pat Lowther, who was murdered by her husband in 1975. Each winner receives an honorarium of $1000.

Winners and shortlists

See also
 Canadian poetry
 List of literary awards honoring women
 List of poetry awards
 List of years in poetry
List of years in literature
Gerald Lampert Award

References

External links
League of Canadian Poets

Canadian poetry awards
Literary awards honoring women
Awards established in 1980
1980 establishments in Canada
English-language literary awards